Boonsboro Historic District is a national historic district at Boonsboro, Washington County, Maryland, United States. The district includes 562 contributing elements. Its component buildings chronicle the town's development from its founding in 1792 through the mid 20th century. Most of the late 18th and early 19th century development in Boonsboro occurred along Main Street, then part of a principal market road between Williamsport, Hagerstown, Frederick, and Baltimore, Maryland. They are mainly of log, frame, or brick construction, with a few stone buildings interspersed.  The majority of the buildings in the district date from the 1820-1850 period coinciding with peak use years of the National Road. Other features of the district include the Boonsboro Cemetery laid out about 1855 in a 19th-century curving plan with a number of exceptionally artistic gravestones, and the office/depot of the Hagerstown-Boonsboro Electric Railway.  The period of significance, from 1792 to 1959 tracks the continuous growth and evolution of the town through the date by which the district had substantially achieved its current form and appearance.

It was added to the National Register of Historic Places in 2005.

References

External links
, including photo from 2004, at Maryland Historical Trust
Boundary Map of the Boonsboro Historic District, Washington County, at Maryland Historical Trust

Boonsboro, Maryland
Historic districts in Washington County, Maryland
Historic districts on the National Register of Historic Places in Maryland
National Register of Historic Places in Washington County, Maryland